An honor system or honesty system  is a philosophical way of running a variety of endeavors based on trust, honor, and honesty. Something that operates under the rule of the "honor system" is usually something that does not have strictly enforced rules governing its principles. In British English, it would more often be called a "trust system" and should not be confused with the British honours system.

The honor system is also a system granting freedom from customary surveillance (as to students or prisoners) with the understanding that those who are so freed will be bound by their honor to observe regulations (e.g. prison farms are operated under the honor system), and will therefore not abuse the trust placed in them.

A person engaged in an honor system has a strong negative concept of breaking or going against it. The negatives may include community shame, loss of status, loss of a personal sense of integrity and pride or in extreme situations, banishment from one's community.

Types of honor systems
There are various types of honor systems that may be employed. A total honor system makes no checks on its users to verify their honesty, thereby easily allowing the system to be cheated. Though the system may face occasional audits, there would be no way thereafter of learning the identity of the violator. Some are simply contingent upon the truthfulness presumed of users; others are present when the losses caused by those who may cheat the system are less costly than a higher security system.

Other honor systems employ random checks of selected users to ensure they are in compliance. A minority of users will undergo this check, while the remainder will be given a chance to get away with a violation. In these cases, the management of the system hopes that the fear of getting checked will coerce users into compliance.

Examples

Transport 
In some places, public transport such as trains, trams and/or buses operate on an honor system called proof-of-payment.  The local government authorities may find it impractical or overly expensive to install ticket-checking turnstiles at every station, and instead rely on casual human surveillance to check if all riders possess tickets.  In such a system one could thus ride the train or bus without paying, and simply hope to be lucky enough to avoid a random ticket check during the trip.  Such behavior is impossible for an honor system by itself to prevent. High penalties tend to be used to offset the financial cost of non-paying riders.

Open road tolling is another example of the use of an honor system in transport, as it permits drivers to access a toll road without having to stop at a toll booth to pay the toll. Such systems in use today typically employ technology such as transponders and automatic number plate recognition to identify and bill users. Nevertheless, without human oversight and intervention such systems cannot prevent, for example, an attempt to obstruct collection of the toll with a defaced or stolen license plate. Therefore, many such toll operators aggressively audit for toll evasion (for example, through the use of high-definition cameras to identify non-paying users) and pursue legal action against violators.

At many Western airports, arriving international passengers are instructed by signs either to walk through one door (usually green) if they have nothing to declare, or a different door (usually red) if they have something to declare. Forcible screening is rare, though customs officers generally have authority to check persons suspected of falsely using the green channel. Items that must be declared commonly include cash, food, alcohol, luxury items, publications, weapons, tobacco, etc. Most other items, including personal belongings such as regular clothing, need not be declared. However, X-ray scans can reveal what items must be declared.

Tourism 

Some hotels, mostly in continental Europe, operate an honesty bar, allowing guests to serve and record their own drinks and saving the cost of a night bartender. Patrons could theoretically lie about their drink consumption, and the hotel would have only limited powers to verify their claims. The concept of hotel "mini-bars" is similar, although the stock is quantified more carefully, making it difficult to lie. As well, most hotel minibars are now equipped with sensors which connect directly with the billing authority, making the honor system unnecessary.

In the Southern Californian recreational sport fishing industry, the honor system is widely used, particularly on open party fishing boats. When the cook is occupied or in his bunk, passengers are permitted to get drinks and snacks on their own, providing they mark their own galley tab.

Many publicly funded museums and art galleries around the world ask for a certain "suggested donation" in exchange for admission. Patrons are almost never supervised during their donations, so there is no way of making sure the suggested minimum is being paid.  Strictly speaking this is not an honor system, as no payment obligation actually exists (merely a suggested donation); a true honor system is one in which there is an obligation, but it is not enforced.  However, these "suggested donation" schemes are often regarded as similar to an honor system, because they rely on the goodwill of patrons rather than the force of law.

National and State parks and some private parks often use an honor system to collect their admission fees. Rather than having a manned booth, they have a drop box known as an honesty box where money can be inserted, either directly, or in an envelope. Sometimes, the envelope contains a stub that is removed and placed on the guest's vehicle.

Many international land borders do not thoroughly check all persons passing the checkpoints for required documents or contraband. When the security threat at the crossing is perceived by the nation's government to be low, checks may be conducted only on random persons or vehicles.

Education 

The first honor system in America was penned by Thomas Jefferson at the College of William and Mary, Jefferson's alma mater.  In some colleges, the honor system is used to administer tests unsupervised. Students are generally asked to sign an honor code statement that says they will not cheat or use unauthorized resources when taking the test.  As an example, at Vanderbilt University students taking examinations are required to sign and include the following pledge: "On my honor as a student I have neither given nor received aid on this examination". Any student caught in violation of the Honor Code is referred to the Honor Council which investigates and determines the appropriate action, which can range from failing the course to expulsion from the university. At the University of Virginia a student taking an examination is also required to sign a pledge not to give or receive aid and there is one penalty for transgression of the honor code, dismissal from the university. Texas A&M also has an Honor System which states, Aggies do not lie, cheat or steal or tolerate those who do. This is listed at the beginning of all tests. Any student that does not follow the code is remanded to the Honor council so they can determine the severity of the case and how the student should be punished or if expulsion is necessary.  The students at the University of North Carolina at Chapel Hill also maintain a student-run honor system.  Students maintain the integrity of the university by pledging not to cheat, steal or lie.  Unlike the University of Virginia, the honor system at Chapel Hill allows for different sanctions, ranging from probation to expulsion. A single-sanction Honor Code exists at the Virginia Military Institute, where a "drum out" ceremony is still carried out upon a cadet's dismissal.

Washington and Lee University maintains an Honor System that was introduced by General Robert E. Lee, who stated "We have but one rule here, and it is that every student must be a gentleman." The Washington & Lee Honor System is entirely administered through the student body. It is one of the few universities in the United States to have a non-codified system. As a result, students decide what constitutes a breach of honor. These breaches are commonly named as lying, cheating, or stealing, but what constitutes an honor violation is open to the interpretation of the current student body. A single sanction of dismissal is enforced when a student is found guilty of an honor violation.

The California Institute of Technology implements an honor code that states "No member of the Caltech community shall take unfair advantage of any other member of the Caltech community."  Applications of this code range from professors trusting the students not to cheat with unsupervised take-home exams, laptops and bikes left unsecured in the dormitory lounges and courtyards (though the lounges and courtyards are secured against people who are not members of the Caltech community), and the food service trusting the students not to conduct food-hoarding raids during open kitchen hours.  The primary enforcement of the Caltech Honor Code is through student-run councils, but a few members of the Caltech faculty are involved.

Crime and justice 

Some lower security inmates at prisons are granted furloughs and allowed to temporarily leave the boundaries of the penitentiary for various reasons with the expectation they will return voluntarily when due without absconding. The reasons for departure may be for employment, education, recreation, or attending family events (such as weddings or funerals).

Non-profit 

Another example can be seen in fundraising drives. Many charities distribute boxes of confectionery to businesses, which are placed in waiting rooms or similar for people to purchase items from. The confectionery is free to be removed by anyone who wishes to take it, and there is no enforcing of payment other than through the expectation of honesty. Indeed, most such boxes of confectionery bear the comment Your honesty is appreciated near where money is deposited.

In many places of worship, those partaking in events with compulsory fees are expected to pay their dues, though most institutions such as these do not enforce payment. There is a general assumption of trust in most religious settings.

The Radical Faeries use a concept of "no one turned away for lack of funds" (abbreviated NOTAFLOF) when raising or charging money to host their events. This is a form of sliding scale used to ensure financial accessibility. The honor system is used to encourage those with adequate resources to pay a suggested amount, but the choice is left up to individual conscience so that those who cannot afford it can participate without being stigmatized or interrogated. This custom has been subsequently adopted by name in other LGBTQ organizations.

Retail 

Some supermarket chains allow customers to scan their own groceries with handheld barcode readers while placing them in their own carts (see self-checkout). While the system gives customers the ability to place groceries in their bags without paying, and customers can be randomly audited, participating supermarkets have reported that this experimental system has not increased the amount of shoplifting.

Many hardware superstores, including Home Depot, allow customers to place small items, such as screws, into bags, then label the bags along with the exact price and quantity of the item they are purchasing. The system, which can be easily cheated, is contingent upon the honesty of customers, and is labeled in many stores as an "honor system."

In some countries, farmers leave bags of produce beside the road outside their houses with prices affixed. Passers-by pay by leaving cash in a container. In Ireland, New Zealand, Ikot Inyang Udo in Akwa Ibom State of Nigeria, Australia and the United Kingdom this is called the honesty box system. In other countries, small unmanned stores are run, where customers are able to enter, obtain what they need, and pay the bill in a secure container.

Sports

In the sport of airsoft, players rely on an honor system to tell whether or not an opponent is hit, because unlike paintballs, airsoft pellets leave no visible markings on clothing.

Two combat sports practiced by the Society for Creative Anachronism, Armored Combat and Rapier Combat, use an honor system to judge valid strikes.  The individual who is hit is responsible for acknowledging if the impact was valid.

Disc ultimate has historically relied on the honor system and encodes it as part of the “Spirit of the Game,” to the point where very few competitions use referees and players are allowed to call fouls on their opponents.

Sports that deliberately incorporate alternative sexualities, by necessity, rely on the honor system for enforcement. The National Gay Flag Football League limits heterosexual competition to 20% of a team's roster. Muggle quidditch requires a minimum number of players to be of a second gender, while allowing players to identify as any number of gender identities to qualify under the rule.

Public health 
During the COVID-19 pandemic, as many people have received their vaccines, the Centers for Disease Control and Prevention issued guidance that fully-vaccinated people no longer had to wear face masks. Many places relied on an honor system to trust that people who were not vaccinated continued to wear face masks.

Advantages
In many places where an honor system is used, it has been found to be cost-effective. Many businesses and organizations using an honor system have determined that the cost of maintaining staff to enforce proper payment outweighs the losses caused by the percentage of the population who are willing to cheat the system. In addition, efficiency is high when an honor system is used. For example, buses/trains do not have to wait to sell or check passenger tickets when boarding and can instead leave immediately, and customs green channels allow for much faster exits than if every passenger is routinely checked.

For the remainder of the population, the honor system gives a more welcoming feeling to customers. Those who are treated with trust may be more likely to return to the location, and thereby increase the amount of business.

Criticism of the concept
Deciding whether or not to obey an honor system can be a dilemma, especially if one places one's personal financial self-interest above the interest of the institution they are patronizing. This can lead to a future negative impact towards their personal financial self-interest. Honor systems are often criticized for promoting laziness and bad behavior. Some have suggested it is paradoxical to ask people to obey a law if there is no apparent law.

See also 
 Hawala or hundi, an informal value transfer system based on an honor system
 Kavka's toxin puzzle examines the paradoxical nature of "rewarding intent."
 Reputation system

References

Bibliography 
 Bowman, James. Honor: A History. Encounter, 2007.
 Wyatt-Brown, Bertram. Southern Honor: Ethics and Behavior in the Old South. OUP, 2007.

System
Group processes